The 1927 Coe Kohawks football team represented Coe College during the 1923 college football season.

Schedule

 There is a possibility that the contest against Carroll on October 15th never took place, as it was only mentioned once and did not elaborate any further into the details of the contest.

References

Coe
Coe Kohawks football seasons
Coe Football